Nancy Drew... Detective is a 1938 American comedy film directed by William Clemens and written by Kenneth Garnet. The film stars Bonita Granville, John Litel, James Stephenson, Frankie Thomas, Frank Orth and Helena Phillips Evans. The film was released by Warner Bros. on November 19, 1938.

Plot
Wealthy Mary Eldredge (Helena Phillips Evans) decides to donate $250,000 (in 2020 purchase-power that would be $4.5 million) to her alma mater, where teenager Nancy Drew (Bonita Granville) is a student. When Mary doesn't deliver the check to the lawyer Carson Drew (John Litel), Nancy's father, and disappears, it seems as if she has backed out of her original intention. And Nancy’s classmates turn on her, annoyed that she had gotten their hopes up about getting a swimming pool for the school.

Nancy sets out to find out what really happened. Along the way, with the help of her neighbor and best friend Ted Nickerson (Frankie Thomas), she deals with the kidnapping of her family's doctor, a slow policeman, and an injured carrier pigeon.

At one point, Nancy and Ted hire a plane to look from the air for a house that fits some clues that they have collected. Planning to rescue Mary, they gain entry to the suspected location, Ted disguised as a nurse and Nancy as a widow. They find Mary but, during their attempted escape, all three are captured. Locked in a basement, Ted finds an old x-ray machine and uses it to produce radio and telephone interference, encoding it to send a call for help.  Nancy’s father and the police get the message and the gang that had kidnapped Mary is caught.

Cast 
 Bonita Granville as Nancy Drew
 John Litel as Carson Drew
 James Stephenson as Challon
 Frankie Thomas as Ted Nickerson (Ned Nickerson in the novel)
 Frank Orth as Captain Tweedy
 Helena Phillips Evans as Mary Eldredge
 Renie Riano as Effie Schneider
 Charles Trowbridge as Hollister
 Dick Purcell as Keiffer
 Edward Keane as Adam Thorne 
 Mae Busch as Miss Tyson
 Jack Mower as Radio Station Technician (uncredited)

Production
The plot is based on the 1933 novel The Password to Larkspur Lane written by Walter Karig as "Carolyn Keene". This was the first of a series of Warner Bros. Nancy Drew films. Three followed in 1939: Nancy Drew... Reporter, then Nancy Drew... Trouble Shooter, and ending with Nancy Drew and the Hidden Staircase.  All four were directed by William Clemens and featured Bonita Granville, John Little as Nancy’s father, and Frankie Thomas. Kenneth Gamet wrote the screenplays.

References

External links 
 
 
 
 

1938 films
Warner Bros. films
American comedy films
1938 comedy films
Films directed by William Clemens
Films scored by Heinz Roemheld
American black-and-white films
Films based on Nancy Drew
1930s English-language films
1930s American films